The Villager is a free weekly newspaper published in Austin, Texas, serving the African-American community. 
The paper covers issues of local interest and also national and international stories.

A unique section of the paper is "The Youth Brigade", which includes articles submitted by students from area schools.  Students earn a stipend for their submission of articles about their school or community.

When the Villager was started in 1973 it was a one-man operation with Tommy Wyatt doing all the story writing and selling of advertisements.  He also shot and developed the photographs. The Villager currently lists six staff, including (Tommy) T. L. Wyatt, Editor-in-Chief and his son, Thomas Wyatt, webmaster and handling distribution. During the first ten years of publication the print run was 5,000.  Today the print run is 6,000 copies every week.

The Villager is the longest-running black community newspaper in Austin.  The paper is involved in community issues.  The Villager's influence has grown over time and politicians regularly seek the paper's endorsement. .
 
As East Austin has changed and African-Americans have moved outside of Austin to places like Pflugerville, Round Rock, Manor, Del Valle, the newspaper's distribution area also changed to reach them.  The free paper is distributed at H-E-B grocery stores, churches and other places around town.  Being an online publication and print publication has also helped The Villager retain its readership.

In 2020 the Austin History Center presented a selection of photographs from the Villager in an exhibition titled, "Our Community, Our Voice: Photographs from The Villager Newspaper".  The collection includes images of local community members and illustrated the vibrancy of Austin's black community. Images of marching bands,  theater groups, community leaders, musicians, protests, and churches, portray life through the decades  in black Austin.  The exhibition runs from January 30 to April 19, 2020.

References

External links
 Official Website - www.theaustinvillager.com

Newspapers published in Austin, Texas
Weekly newspapers published in Texas